The Revolutionary United Front (RUF) was a rebel group that fought a failed eleven-year war in Sierra Leone, beginning in 1991 and ending in 2002. It later transformed into a political party, which still exists today.  The three most senior surviving leaders, Issa Sesay, Morris Kallon and Augustine Gbao, were convicted in February 2009 of war crimes and crimes against humanity.

Creation 
The RUF initially coalesced as a group of Sierra Leoneans which led National Patriotic Front of Liberia elements across the border in an attempt to replicate Charles Taylor's earlier success in toppling the Liberian government.

The RUF was created by Foday Sankoh, of Temne background, and some allies, Abu Kanu, Rashid Mansaray, with substantial assistance from Charles Taylor of Liberia. Initially, the RUF was popular with Sierra Leoneans, many of whom resented a Freetown elite seen as corrupt and looked forward to promised free education and health care and equitable sharing of diamond revenues. However, the RUF developed a reputation internationally for its terrible cruelty towards the civilian population during its decade-long struggle, especially its practice of hacking off limbs to intimidate and spread terror among the population, and its widespread use of child soldiers.

When it was first formed, the RUF put forward the slogan, "No More Slaves, No More Masters. Power and Wealth to the People."
While its goal was clearly to change the government of Sierra Leone, the RUF gave little indication of what sort of government would replace it. The group did not advocate Marxism or any similar leftist ideology, nor did it advocate extreme nationalism or Fascism. It also did not claim to be a force fighting for a certain ethnic group or region.
At one point, during ongoing peace negotiations in 1995, RUF published a pamphlet entitled "Footpaths to Democracy: Toward a New Sierra Leone", which contained some rhetorical references to social justice and pan-Africanism.

Coup 
Foday Sankoh did not stand by his earlier promises of equitably sharing diamond revenues and used these funds to buy arms for himself.
With a significant area of the diamond mines under the control of the rebel party, the RUF became singularly focused on protecting its resource base.

Sierra Leone's economy collapsed, with ordinary citizens trapped between the cruelty of RUF troops and starvation. After a coup by the Armed Forces Revolutionary Council (AFRC) in 1997, the RUF and AFRC created a joint junta to control the country before being evicted from the capital by the intervention of a Nigerian-led West African force that reinstated President Ahmad Tejan Kabbah. The war is estimated to have cost the lives of about 200,000 people.

Child soldiers 
Child soldiers were heavily recruited in the Sierra Leone Civil War; a total of 11,000 are thought to have participated in the conflict. Most were used for attacks on villages and on guard duty at diamond fields as well as guarding weapons stockpiles. The RUF made extensive use of child soldiers.

Thousands of abducted boys and girls were forced to serve as soldiers or as prostitutes,
and those chosen to be fighters were sometimes forced to murder their parents.
Guerrillas frequently carved the initials "RUF" on their chests, and officers reportedly rubbed cocaine into open cuts on their troops to make them maniacal and fearless. Before some battles and raids, the children would be given mixtures of cocaine and gunpowder. The gunpowder mixture was called "Brown Brown" and it allowed the cocaine to flow more freely through the blood stream.

For entertainment, some soldiers would bet on the sex of an unborn baby and then slice open a woman's womb to determine the winner. The RUF abducted children aged 7 to 12, but were known to take children as young as 5 year olds. The children were notoriously known by captains and civilians for their unquestionable obedience and enormous cruelty.

Atrocities 
In response to the immediate execution of rebels by government forces, the RUF instituted a policy of cutting off the hands of captured soldiers with the intent of sending the message: "You don't hold your weapon against your brother." Brandishing machetes, RUF rebels amputated the hands, arms, and legs of tens of thousands of Sierra Leoneans. The RUF indicated that the reason for these actions was that amputees could no longer mine diamonds, which might be used to support government troops.

The election slogan at that time was that the people "had power in their hands", so the RUF would hack the hands off to prevent people from voting. RUF members are also said to have practised cannibalism. Refugee camps were set up for amputees, supported by the government and other relief agencies.

Foreign pressure and intervention
In March 1997, Sankoh fled to Nigeria, where he was put under house arrest, and then imprisoned. Before he was later released in 1999, Sam Bockarie performed the task of director of military operations of the RUF. In 1999, after enormous pressure by the United States, the United Kingdom, the UN, and various other countries, Sankoh was forced into signing the Lomé Peace Accord on 7 July 1999.

Sankoh was then allowed to return under the conditions of the agreement. However fighting again broke out, and the UN sent peacekeeping troops in hopes of integrating the RUF into a new national army. This intervention failed as well, and by 2000 they held 500 UN peacekeepers hostage until their release was negotiated by Taylor. The UK, Guinea, India, Bangladesh, Pakistan and various other nations, sent in professional forces in 2001. The RUF was noted to be weakened, especially decreasing resources, and hence had to suffer several crushing defeats at the hands of the British special forces; which eventually led to the end of the revolution, hence the end of the civil war in Sierra Leone. Sankoh was later captured by a mob and handed to the British Army in Sierra Leone. He was indicted for multiple war crimes by a UN-backed special court. In 2003 Sankoh died in prison before the trial took place.

Four years later, during the sessions of the Special Court for Sierra Leone, prosecutors claimed that Charles Taylor had actively participated in directing the RUF's strategy from Liberia; among the allegations was that he had arranged to transport RUF commanders to Monrovia to meet with them personally.

Political party 

After peace was established, RUF was transformed into a political party: the Revolutionary United Front Party. As of 2006, the general secretary of the party was Jonathan. In the May 10, 2001 general election the party won 2.2% of popular votes and no seats. Its candidate at the presidential elections, Alimamy Pallo Bangura, received 1.7% of the vote. The party received its highest voting in Kailahun, 7.8% in the parliamentary election.

The RUF most recently participated in the 2018 general election in Sierra Leone and had the 6th highest vote tally in the country. It was not considered to be a significant contender.

Cultural references

Television 
 Law & Order episode "Blood Money" was centered around the strife in Sierra Leone and the traffic in conflict diamonds
 Walker, Texas Ranger had an episode entitled "Blood Diamonds" based in part on the RUF which brought to light some of their atrocities as well as the black market trade of blood diamonds for illegal arms.

Film 
 Cry Freetown is a 2000 documentary film directed by Sorious Samura. It is an account of the victims of the Sierra Leone Civil War and depicts the most brutal period with the Revolutionary United Front (RUF) rebels capturing the capital city (January 1999).
 In the 2005 movie Lord of War, the protagonist played by Nicolas Cage sells weapons to the RUF.
 RUF was featured significantly in the 2006 movie Blood Diamond starring Leonardo DiCaprio. In this film, RUF is used largely to create the social climate in which the film is set, and the (fictional) depicted commanders of the group are the main antagonists and villains of the story.
 The 2010 film Predators is about a group of the most dangerous people on Earth who are taken to an alien planet to be hunted; one of them is a member of RUF named Mombasa, portrayed by Mahershala Ali. 
 The 2012 documentary Life does not lose its value focuses on the reintegration of former child soldiers, after they have lived years in the forest with the RUF rebels.

Books 

 The RUF's activities also formed the central focus of the autobiographical book A Long Way Gone: Memoirs of a Boy Soldier by Ishmael Beah which was published in 2007.

Music

 Kanye West released a song called Diamonds from Sierra Leone in his album Late Registration, West later remixed the song alongside Jay-Z.

See also
 Sobel (Sierra Leone)

References

External links 
 RUF manifesto — Footpaths to Democracy
 The Empire in Africa

1991 establishments in Sierra Leone
2000s establishments in Sierra Leone
2002 disestablishments in Africa
2003 establishments in Africa
Blood diamonds
Cannibalism in Africa
History of Sierra Leone
Organizations disestablished in 2002
Organizations established in 1991
Pan-Africanist political parties in Africa
Political parties established in 2003
Political parties in Sierra Leone
Rebel groups in Sierra Leone
Sierra Leone Civil War
Special Court for Sierra Leone